Twisted (stylized as twiƨted) is an American teen drama mystery-thriller television series. The pilot episode aired on March 19, 2013, and the show's remaining 10 episodes resumed airing on June 18, 2013.

On July 30, 2013, Twisted was picked up for a full season of 19 episodes and the second half of season one started airing on February 11, 2014. The season finale aired on April 1, 2014.

On August 13, 2014, ABC Family announced that Twisted would not be renewed for a second season.

Plot
The series focuses on charming sixteen-year-old Danny Desai (Avan Jogia) who was charged with killing his aunt when he was eleven. Having spent five years in juvenile detention, he is released and returns to his hometown of Green Grove, New York. While trying to rekindle old friendships and facing the challenges of dealing with his judgmental peers, Danny becomes the prime suspect in the murder of a classmate. Realizing the town does not care about the truth and only wants to see him charged with the crime, Danny becomes determined to clear his name. Meanwhile, he must maintain a secret he has never told anyone; the real person who killed his aunt.

Cast and characters

Main
 Avan Jogia as Danny Desai, a charming 16-year-old who has recently been released from juvie for the murder of his Aunt Tara. He instantly becomes a suspect to Regina's murder. He is first in love with Lacey but realizes his true feelings for Jo.
 Maddie Hasson as Jo Masterson, a smart girl who was traumatized by her childhood and became a social outcast. She is in love with Danny but realizes he will never think of her more than a friend. She dates Tyler briefly and loses her virginity with him to forget Danny. After Tyler, she starts dating Charlie going against how Danny feels about him but Charlie turns out to be a liar and had many secrets so they break up. Danny shortly after the break up tells Jo his feelings for her. When Jo needs time to "think about it" they have plans to meet at a library but she never makes it due to Charlie kidnapping her.
 Kylie Bunbury as Lacey Porter, an independent girl who worked hard to achieve her popular status in high school after Danny went away to juvie. Conscious of her status, she would first avoid Jo and Danny for fear of losing her popularity. However, she soon befriends the two again. She is also Danny's girlfriend for a while until they break up later in the season.
 Ashton Moio as Rico Winter, Jo's hard working, intelligent and awkward guy friend who secretly has a crush on her. He finds that Jo doesn't return his feelings so he starts dating Andie.
 Denise Richards as Karen Desai, Danny's devoted mother, Vikram's wife and Jack's love interest.
 Kimberly Quinn as Tess Masterson, Jo's mother and Karen's friend.
 Sam Robards as Kyle Masterson, the town's Chief of Police and Jo's overprotective father. Kyle tries to protect Jo from Charlie and Danny when he can.

Recurring

 TJ Ramini as Vikram Desai, Danny's father and Karen's husband.
 Ivan Sergei as Jack Taylor, a boat mechanic and Vikram's old business partner. He's in love with Karen.
 Grey Damon as Archie Yates, Lacey's ex-boyfriend and Danny's nemesis.
 Brittany Curran as Phoebe Daly, an overly-dramatic and eccentric student and former enemy of Regina.
 Chris Zylka as Tyler Lewis, Phoebe's half-brother and a popular student interested in film production and in dating Jo. He was the mastermind behind multiple pranks against Danny. 
 Jamila Velazquez as Sarita Sanchez, Lacey's former best friend and the popular 'mean girl'.
 John DeLuca as Cole Farrell, a soccer player who becomes Danny's friend.
 Todd Julian as Scott Ogden, Archie's best friend.
 Christopher Cousins as Mayor John Rollins
 Robin Givens as Judy, Lacey's mother.
 Jack Falahee as Charlie McBride, the new kid at Green Grove. He was Danny's cellmate in juvie, he appears to be romantically interested in Lacey, but then pursues Jo. He is the adoptive son of Tara Desai and is the biological son of Tess Masterson. 
 Jessica Tuck as Gloria Crane, the mother of murdered student Regina.
 Daya Vaidya as Sandy Palmer, Kyle's very attractive deputy assistant.
 Aaron Hill as Eddie Garrett, a cop who works with Kyle.
 Rob Chen as Principal Mark Tang, the principal of the school. His readmission of Danny was a condition of a short affair he had with Karen.
 Ely Henry as Doug Mars, one of Rico's fellow "mathletes".
 Cynthy Wu as Andie Dang, a smart but shy girl in Green Grove High.
 Stacy Haiduk as Marilyn Rossi, a private investigator hired by Mayor Rollins to solve the Regina Crane murder case.
 Brianne Howey as Whitney Taylor, Jack's daughter who is very wild and free spirited.
 Keiko Agena as April Tanaka, a grief therapist brought in to help students deal with Regina's death.
 Kathy Najimy as Mrs. Fisk, a teacher at Green Grove High School.

Development and production
The series was originally titled Socio, but was renamed during production in early 2013.

The show is partially filmed in the Hudson Valley Area. Some of the scenes are shot in the small village of Nyack, NY (35 miles North of Manhattan). Johnny Cakes, where many of the scenes take place, is a real diner located on Main Street in Nyack.

Casting
Maddie Hasson and Kylie Bunbury were cast as Jo and Lacey in September 2012. A month later, Avan Jogia, Denise Richards, Kimberly Quinn, Kathy Najimy and Grey Damon were announced to play Danny, Karen, Tess, Mrs. Fisk and Archie. The pilot was greenlighted in August 2012, and was filmed three months later in New York City in October. In February 2013, ABC Family ordered the show as a series. On April 3, 2013, production commenced in Studio City.

Episodes
The 19-episode first season began with a sneak peek on March 19, 2013, before its official premiere on June 11, 2013, receiving 1.19 million viewers and 1.61 million viewers, respectively. The mid-season finale aired on August 27, 2013. The second half of the season aired from February 11, 2014 through April 1, 2014. A recap episode narrated by Ashton Moio titled "Socio Studies 101" aired on August 20, 2013, and gathered 0.99 million viewers.

Broadcast

Reception

Critical reception 
On the review aggregator website Rotten Tomatoes, the first season holds an approval rating of 73% based on 11 reviews, with an average rating of 6.80/10. The site's critics consensus reads, "Twisted might offer below-average dialogue in terms of moody teen faire, but a compelling cast makes the grade." On Metacritic, the first season of the show holds a score 66 out of 100 based on reviews from 7 critics, indicating "generally favorable reviews."

Accolades

References

External links
 

2010s American high school television series
2010s American mystery television series
2010s American teen drama television series
2013 American television series debuts
2014 American television series endings
ABC Family original programming
English-language television shows
Serial drama television series
Television series about teenagers
Television shows set in New York (state)
Television series by Disney–ABC Domestic Television